Konstantin Yakovlevich Kryzhitsky (Russian: Константин Яковлевич Крыжицкий; 17 May 1858, Kiev, Russian Empire (present-day Kyiv, Ukraine) - 4 April 1911, Saint Petersburg, Russian Empire) was a Russian Imperial landscape painter and drawing teacher of Ukrainian-Polish descent, who was the first chairman of the Arkhip Kuindzhi art society in St. Petersburg.

Biography 
He was born in a family with Ukrainian-Polish background. His father was a merchant. After finishing his primary education, he attended the drawing school operated by Nikolay Murashko. In 1877, he entered the St. Petersburg Imperial Academy of Arts, where he studied with Mikhail Clodt. He completed his courses there in 1884, receiving the title of "Artist First-Class" and a gold medal for his painting "The Oaks". From 1884 to 1906, he taught drawing at the "Nikolaevsky Orphan Institute" in Gatchina.

In 1880, he became one of the first members of the Society of Russian Watercolorists. In 1889, his painting "Forest Vista" was purchased by Tsar Alexander III and he was named an "Academician". He visited France and Germany in the 1890s and exhibited at the Exposition Universelle (1900). That same year, he became a full member of the Academy. Later, he served as Chairman of an art society created by a bequest from his friend Arkhip Kuindzhi. He often returned to the area around Kiev to paint landscapes in oils and watercolors.

In 1910, he was accused of plagiarism by the tabloid press because one of his paintings was similar to a work by Yakov Brovar (1864–1941). Apparently, the resemblance derived from a photograph taken in the Białowieża Forest, that was later used as a model by both artists, and involved a single, distinctive tree. When this was pointed out, his critics declared that using a photograph for a painting was a form of "cheating". Due to the negative publicity and its effect on his reputation, he committed suicide. His maid found him in his office, where he had hung himself and left a suicide note.

Selected paintings

References

Further reading
 Константин Крыжицкий, "Masters of Painting" series, Белый Город, 2005

External links 

 Paintings, criticism and Biographical notes on Kryzhitsky @ Rodon.
 ArtNet: More works by Kryzhitsky.
 Biography and appreciation @ Воскресный день
 Yakov Brovar @ Russian Antique Gallery. Paintings @ ArtNet

1858 births
1911 deaths
Ukrainian emigrants to Russia
19th-century painters from the Russian Empire
Russian male painters
20th-century Russian painters
Russian landscape painters
Artists from Kyiv
Artists who committed suicide
Suicides by hanging in Russia
19th-century male artists from the Russian Empire
20th-century Russian male artists